Joseph John Watson (born July 6, 1943) is a Canadian former professional ice hockey defenceman who played for the Boston Bruins, Philadelphia Flyers, and Colorado Rockies during his National Hockey League (NHL) career. With the Flyers, he played with his younger brother Jimmy for several seasons, and was a member of the Flyers' back-to-back Stanley Cup championship teams. In the infamous 1976 game against the Soviet Red Army team, Watson, a defenceman and not a big scorer, scored a shorthanded goal against the great Vladislav Tretiak, causing Flyers coach Fred Shero to joke that Watson had "set Russian hockey back 25 years".

Career statistics

Regular season and playoffs

References

External links
 

1943 births
Boston Bruins players
Canadian expatriate ice hockey players in the United States
Canadian ice hockey defencemen
Colorado Rockies (NHL) players
Estevan Bruins players
Ice hockey people from British Columbia
Living people
Minneapolis Bruins players
National Hockey League All-Stars
Oklahoma City Blazers (1965–1977) players
People from Smithers, British Columbia
Philadelphia Flyers players
Stanley Cup champions